The 2nd Quick Response Division (hanja: 二迅速對應師團), also known as Furious Wave Division (hanja: 怒濤部隊), is a military formation of the Republic of Korea Army and is the only infantry division in the VII Maneuver Corps to serve as an offensive and air assault mission.

History 
It was formed during the Korean War and was part of the defensive line in the Third Battle of Seoul.

The 17th Infantry participated in the Battle of Pusan Perimeter.

Beginning on December 26, 1950, Communist Chinese Forces struck hard at United Nations units on the western approaches to Seoul. Supporting attacks occurred as well in the central and eastern parts of the line. The Chinese hit the ROK units hard, and again several units broke. Two out of three regiments of the 2nd Division fled the battlefield, leaving the 17th Regiment to fight alone and hold its position for hours despite heavy losses. General Ridgway reluctantly ordered a general, but orderly, withdrawal, with units instructed to maintain contact with the enemy during their retreat, rather than simply giving up real estate without inflicting losses on the enemy.

On January 1, 2021, the 2nd Division moved its headquarters to Yangpyeong and was reorganized into a quick response division to take charge of offensive and air assault missions by integrating The 201st Commando Brigade and The 203rd Commando Brigade under 2nd Operations Command.

Organization 
 Headquarters:
 Headquarters Company
 Combat Support Company
 Signal Company
 The 201st Quick Response Brigade
 201st Quick Response Brigade Headquarters and Headquarters Company
 1st Quick Response Battalion
 2nd Quick Response Battalion
 3rd Quick Response Battalion
 Artillery Battalion
 The 203rd Quick Response Brigade
 203rd Quick Response Brigade Headquarters and Headquarters Company
 1st Quick Response Battalion
 2nd Quick Response Battalion
 3rd Quick Response Battalion
 Artillery Battalion

Unit of the VII Maneuver Corps 
Capital Mechanized Infantry Division
8th Maneuver Division
11th Maneuver Division

See also 
Republic of Korea Army

References 

InfDiv0002
InfDiv0002SK
Military units and formations established in 1949
Military units and formations disestablished in 2019